The 1986 Soviet Cup Final was a football match that took place at the Lenin's Central Stadium, Moscow on May 2, 1986. The match was the 45th Soviet Cup Final and it was contested by FC Torpedo Moscow and FC Shakhtar Donetsk. The Soviet Cup winner Torpedo won the cup for the sixth time. The last year defending holders Dynamo Kyiv were eliminated in the round of 16 of the competition by FC Spartak Moscow on penalties.

Road to Moscow 
All sixteen Soviet Top League clubs did not have to go through qualification to get into the competition, so Torpedo and Shakhter both qualified for the competition automatically.

Note: In all results below, the score of the finalist is given first (H: home; A: away).

Previous Encounters

Match details

MATCH OFFICIALS 
Assistant referees:
 A.Khokhryakov (Yoshkar-Ola)
 N.Zakharov (Vladimir)
Fourth official: 

MATCH RULES
90 minutes.
30 minutes of extra-time if necessary.
Penalty shoot-out if scores still level.
Seven named substitutes
Maximum of 3 substitutions.

See also
 Soviet Top League 1986
 Soviet First League 1986
 Soviet Second League 1986

References

External links 
The competition calendar

1986
Cup
Soviet Cup Final 1986
Soviet Cup Final 1986
May 1986 sports events in Europe
1986 in Moscow